"Electric " is the second single released from the Australian pop group Girlband.

Track listing
 "Electric" (Radio Edit)
 "Electric" (Kam Denny Club Mix)
 "Electric" (Kam Denny Dub Mix)
 "By Your Side"

Charts

2007 singles
Songs written by Arnthor Birgisson
Songs written by Ali Tennant
Sony BMG singles
2007 songs